Krystsina Yurieuna Markovich (Belarusian: Крысціна Юр’еўа Марковіч; Russian: Кристина Юрьевна Маркович; born on 19 June 1978), is a Belarusian former synchronized swimmer. She competed at the 2000 and 2004 Summer Olympics.

References

1978 births
Living people
Belarusian synchronized swimmers
Olympic synchronized swimmers of Belarus
Synchronized swimmers at the 2000 Summer Olympics
Synchronized swimmers at the 2004 Summer Olympics